Mitti Ke Putlay is a Pakistani film, directed by Ehtesham, produced by Nadeem, and they both mutually wrote its script. The film revolves around the struggle and rights of the labours. Music of the film was composed by M. Ashraf and Muslehuddin.

Cast 

 Nisho
 Nadeem
 Afzaal Ahmad
 Yasmeen Khan
 Qavi
 Munawar Saeed

References 

Urdu-language Pakistani films
1970s Urdu-language films